Nuttall may refer to:

People
 Nuttall (name)
 Nuttall baronets

Nature
 Nuttall's oak, a fast-growing large deciduous oak tree native to North America
 Nuttall's woodpecker, a species of woodpecker found in oak woodlands of California
 Nuttall sandstone, a very hard type of sandstone; see New River Gorge National River
 Nuttall's toothwort, a species of cardamine flower.

Places 
 Nuttall, Virginia, United States
 Nuttall railway station, Nuttall village, Nasirabad, Balochistan, Pakistan

Other uses
 BAM Nuttall, a British construction company
 Blackman–Nuttall window, a mathematical function used in signal processing—see Window function
 Codex Zouche-Nuttall, a pre-Columbian piece of Mixtec writing
 Geiger–Nuttall law, a rule in nuclear physics stating that short-lived isotopes emit more energetic alpha particles than long-lived ones
 Nuttall Ornithological Club, the oldest ornithology organization in United States
 The Nuttall Encyclopædia, an early 20th-century encyclopedia
Thomas “Tom” Nuttall, a saloon owner in the TV series Deadwood, portrayed by Leon Rippy